Persiko stands for Persatuan Sepakbola Indonesia Kota Baru (en: Football Association of Indonesia New Town). Persiko Kota Baru is an  Indonesian football club based in Kotabaru Regency, South Kalimantan. Club played in Liga 3.

References

External links
Liga-Indonesia.co.id

Football clubs in Indonesia
Football clubs in South Kalimantan